Martin Beiser (born 4 March 1971 in Oberstdorf) is a former German curler and curling coach.

He is a former German men's curling champion (1992).

Awards and honours
  All-Star Team, Men: .

Teams

Record as a coach of national teams

References

External links
 
 Martin Beiser | ICO Oberstdorf 
 DCV - Olympia-Team in Steckbriefen: Coach Martin Beiser  (web archive)

Living people
1971 births
People from Oberstdorf
Sportspeople from Swabia (Bavaria)
German male curlers
German curling champions
German curling coaches